Folly is an unincorporated community in Northumberland County, in the U.S. state of Virginia.

According to tradition, a lumberman made a "folly" when he overestimated the amount of timber in the area, hence the name.

References

Unincorporated communities in Virginia
Unincorporated communities in Northumberland County, Virginia